Fred or Frederick Archer may refer to:

 Fred Archer (jockey) (1857–1886), English jockey
 Fred R. Archer (1889–1963), photographer and co-inventor of the photographic Zone System
 Frederick Scott Archer (1813–1857), inventor of the photographic collodion process
 Fred Archer (writer) (1915–1999), English farmer and author
 Fred Archer (baseball) (1910–1981), American baseball player
 Fred V. Archer (1888–1971), American college football head coach
 Fred W. Archer (1859–1936), member of the Legislative Assembly of Alberta, 1913–1917
 Frederic Archer (1838–1901), British composer and organist
 Frederick Archer (cricketer) (1888–1937), Barbadian cricketer